The Maharashtra women's cricket team is an Indian domestic cricket team representing the Indian state of Maharashtra. The team has represented the state in Women's Senior One Day Trophy (List A) and  Senior women's T20 league.

Current squad
Smriti Mandhana
Mukta Magre
Hrutuja Deshmukh
Shivali Shinde (wk)
Aditi Gaekwad
Anuja Patil
Sayali Lonkar
Rutuja Gilbile
Priyanka Ghodke
Priyanka Garkhede (c)
Shardda Pokharkar
Maya Sonawane
Utkarsha Pawar

Honours
 Inter State Women's Competition:
 Runners-up (1): 2007–08
 Women's Senior One Day Trophy:
 Runners-up (4): 2006–07, 2007–08, 2008–09, 2016–17
 Women's Senior T20 Trophy:
 Runners-up (5): 2009–10, 2014–15, 2015–16, 2017–18, 2021–22

References

Women's cricket teams in India
Cricket in Maharashtra